Kerzers Papiliorama railway station is a railway station in the municipality of Kerzers, in the Swiss canton of Fribourg. It is an intermediate stop on the standard gauge Palézieux–Lyss railway line of Swiss Federal Railways. The station serves the nearby butterfly sanctuary.

Services 
The following services stop at Kerzers Papiliorama:

References

External links 
 
 

Railway stations in the canton of Fribourg
Swiss Federal Railways stations